The Ven   Herbert Francis Kirkpatrick  (31 July 1888 – 21 July 1971) was an eminent Anglican priest in the first half of the  20th century.

He was born into an ecclesiastical family, the son of the Very Reverend Alexander Francis Kirkpatrick, Dean of Ely from 1907 until 1936.  He was educated at Marlborough and Jesus College, Cambridge. After curacies in Middlesbrough and Torquay he became Vicar of All Saints, Cambridge, a post he held until 1922. He was Principal of the Missionary College of SS Peter and Paul in Dorchester on Thames from then until 1947 when he was appointed Archdeacon of Ely. He retired in 1961 and died a decade later.

References

1888 births
People educated at Marlborough College
Alumni of Jesus College, Cambridge
Archdeacons of Ely
1961 deaths